Morenchies  is a former commune in the Nord department in northern France. In 1971 it was merged into Cambrai.

Heraldry

See also
Communes of the Nord department

References

Former communes of Nord (French department)
Cambrai